Striatophasma is a genus of insects in the family Mantophasmatidae. It is a monotypic genus consisting of the species Striatophasma naukluftense.

Striatophasma naukluftense is endemic to central Namibia. It is found in the Naukluft Mountains.

References

Mantophasmatidae
Monotypic insect genera
Insects of Namibia
Endemic fauna of Namibia